= Tuttorosso =

Tuttorosso is a brand of tomato based products which is a subsidiary of Red Gold.

Tuttorosso have been used in family recipes. Tuttorosso's crushed tomatoes in thick puree with basil have been a favorite among tasters.
